Attorney General Lloyd may refer to:

David Lloyd (judge) (1656–1731), Attorney General of Pennsylvania
William F. Lloyd (1864–1937), Attorney General of Newfoundland

See also
General Lloyd (disambiguation)